Cataegis meroglypta is a species of sea snail, a marine gastropod mollusk in the family Cataegidae.

Description
The height of the shell attains 19 mm.

Distribution
This species occurs in the Western Atlantic Ocean, in the Caribbean Sea off Colombia and in the Gulf of Mexico off Louisiana.

References

 Rosenberg, G., F. Moretzsohn, and E. F. García. 2009. Gastropoda (Mollusca) of the Gulf of Mexico, pp. 579–699 in Felder, D.L. and D.K. Camp (eds.), Gulf of Mexico–Origins, Waters, and Biota. Biodiversity. Texas A&M Press, College Station, Texas

External links
 

meroglypta
Gastropods described in 1987